Alberta Provincial Highway No. 63, commonly referred to as Highway 63, is a  highway in northern Alberta, Canada that connects the Athabasca oil sands and Fort McMurray to Edmonton via Highway 28.  It begins as a two-lane road near the hamlet of Radway where it splits from Highway 28, running north through aspen parkland and farmland of north central Alberta.  North of Boyle, it curves east to pass through the hamlet of Grassland and becomes divided west of Atmore where it again turns north, this time through heavy boreal forest and muskeg, particularly beyond Wandering River.  Traffic levels significantly increase as Highway 63 bends through Fort McMurray, crossing the Athabasca River before connecting the city to the Syncrude and Suncor Energy plants further north.  It ends approximately  beyond a second crossing of the Athabasca River northeast of Fort McKay.

The southern segment of Highway 63 from Radway to Atmore was built before the mid-1950s and numbered as Highway 46 until the 1970s.  Construction north of Atmore on the first road connecting Fort McMurray to the rest of the Alberta highway system began in 1962.  Upgrades in the following decades saw the two-lane highway widened and improved with the addition of passing lanes, and extended to its present terminus northeast of Fort McKay.  Since 2004, the highway has formed the majority of the National Highway System core route between Fort McMurray and Edmonton, and in 2016 played a key role in the evacuation of over 80,000 people from Fort McMurray and the surrounding areas during a highly destructive wildfire.

Despite relatively low traffic volumes compared to other major highways in the province, the route has earned the moniker "Highway of Death" due to many fatal crashes.  In 2006, Alberta committed to twinning the  stretch from Grassland to Fort McMurray, but progress was initially slower than anticipated due to muskeg and wildlife restrictions. After a particularly high-profile crash killed seven people, the province announced an accelerated timeline for the project in 2012 and all work was completed in 2016.  Alberta has long-term plans to create a divided highway for the entire length of the Edmonton–Fort McMurray corridor by similarly upgrading the southernmost  of the highway, a portion of Highway 28, and the entirety of Highway 28A.

Route description

Thorhild and Athabasca Counties
It splits to the north, first intersecting Highways 18 and 656 east of Thorhild, before continuing north through the hamlet of Abee after which it curves slightly to the northeast, paralleling a railway line. It proceeds on this northeasterly heading for less than  before veering back north and intersecting Highway 661 in Newbrook. Highway 63 carries on through aspen parkland into Athabasca County past Ellscott to Highway 663 south of Flat Lake. It turns due east, concurrent with 663 for  until the village of Boyle from which Highway 663 continues east past Skeleton Lake to Lac La Biche. Highway 63 carries on, curving back due north along the east shore of Flat Lake to its first intersection with Highway 55 south of the hamlet of Donatville. The two continue north concurrently, and beyond Skeleton Lake turns east through the hamlet of Grassland to an intersection at the southwest corner of Charron Lake near Atmore, marking the end of this second concurrency. Highway 55 continues east as an alternate route into Lac La Biche, and Highway 855 turns south to the town of Smoky Lake. Highway 63 turns north, becoming a divided highway soon thereafter.

Highway 63 continues through the aspen parkland of Athabasca County on a northeasterly heading, briefly following the northwest shore of Charron Lake before turning due north into the increasingly wooded terrain of northern Alberta. It crosses the La Biche River then parallels its east bank for the next .   north of Atmore the highway reaches the hamlet of Wandering River, the only significant community between Atmore and Fort McMurray.

Lac La Biche County and Fort McMurray
The highway veers slightly northwest, paralleling the Hangingstone River for the remaining  of its journey to an access for Fort McMurray International Airport at Airport Road (formerly Highway 69), and the southern limit of Fort McMurray. In Fort McMurray, Highway 63 continues as a divided expressway along the east bank of the Hangingstone River through the communities of Gregoire and Beacon Hill. It then adopts the name Memorial Drive, curving slightly east and then back north before descending to cross the river after a diamond interchange at Prairie Loop Boulevard. Climbing from the Hangingstone River, a second diamond interchange at Hospital Street follows as the four lanes of Highway 63 bypass downtown Fort McMurray to the west, separating it from the neighbourhoods of Hilltop Estates and Aspen Gardens. The highway then turns west to cross the Athabasca River on three bridges. The northernmost bridge, the Athabasca River Bridge, carries three through lanes and two lanes from Franklin Avenue that eventually merge into the main northbound lanes on the west side of the river. The Ralph Steinhauer Bridge is in the centre, carrying the three main eastbound lanes. The Grant MacEwan Bridge is the southernmost crossing; it carries two lanes of eastbound traffic exiting from Highway 63 to Franklin Avenue and C.A. Knight Way downtown. On the river's east bank, the two lanes from the MacEwan descend into a short tunnel under the northern bridges to reach Franklin Avenue.

West of the river, Highway 63 and its brief collector-distributor system curve north to follow the Athabasca's west bank toward Fort McKay, passing the neighbourhood of Ross Haven en route to trumpet interchanges each at Thickwood Boulveard, Confederation Way, and Parsons Access Road, the last of which essentially marks the northern limit of Fort McMurray's residential development. The divided highway continues north alongside the river through boreal forest to Tar Island where it bends slightly northwest. The northbound and southbound lanes diverge as the highway passes between the Suncor Energy and Syncrude plants near Mildred Lake. The two carriageways then rejoin and the highway becomes undivided, but  later a brief  divided section precedes a second crossing of the Athabasca River on the Peter Lougheed Bridge. The Fort McKay Road splits to the north from the divided section prior to the river, providing access to the community of Fort McKay. The unnamed local paved road continues for another  before becoming gravel. In the winter months, it carries on north to Fort Chipewyan on the western shore of Lake Athabasca as a winter road through the Regional Municipality of Wood Buffalo, paralleling the Athabasca River.

Traffic
Divided for the majority of its length, traffic volumes on Highway 63 south of the Highway 881 junction near Fort McMurray remain relatively light despite the high number of fatal crashes.  The volume is comparable to major two-lane highways in Alberta such as Highways 2A, 8, 22, 28, and 39.  All are in the vicinity of 10,000 vehicles per day or more in rural areas, generally double the average of Highway 63.  While Alberta has plans to twin at least a portion of most of these highways, no project has reached the construction stage nor been expedited like Highway 63.  Until 2013, traffic levels had steadily increased on Highway 63, and an increasing number of trucks carrying large equipment caused traffic delays. Such loads often are wide enough to occupy two traffic lanes which impedes traffic in both directions, and as a result motorists have shared notice of super-wide loads on social media so that others could schedule their trips around them. The highway is the only route leading south out of Fort McMurray until its split with Highway 881, making it a critical link to Fort McMurray and the Athabasca oil sands.  The economic importance of the area, the number of slow moving vehicles, and the absence of alternate routes are not generally reflected in annual traffic numbers, but were factors in the decision to expedite twinning of the highway.

Year-over-year, traffic decreased on Highway 63 in 2016 at most locations measured by Alberta Transportation compared to 2015.  In Fort McMurray, traffic over the Athabascsa River decreased by nearly 12% in 2016 compared to 2015.  In addition to the wildfire, Statistics Canada estimates that over 33,000 oil and gas related jobs were lost in Alberta from December 2014 to April 2016, likely reducing travel to and from Fort McMurray via Highway 63, and also on Highway 881 which has similarly decreased since 2013. Other 2016 estimates say more than 40,000 oilpatch jobs were lost since the end of 2014.  Traffic levels increased again in 2017, nearly reaching 2015 levels over the Athabasca River in Fort McMurray, but trended downward again in 2018 and 2019.

Collisions
The road has earned the nickname "Highway of Death" due to a high number of fatal collisions. Between 2001 and 2005, over 1,000 crashes occurred on Highway 63 in which 25 people were killed and 257 others were injured. At least 149 people died between 1990 and 2012, 125 of which occurred on the 240-kilometre stretch between Grassland and Fort McMurray.  The figure includes seven who died when two pickup trucks collided head-on near Wandering River on April 27, 2012.  Days later, hundreds met at MacDonald Island Park in Fort McMurray to protest the slow pace of improvements to the highway.  Many called for twinning of the highway to be expedited, with only  of the province's original 240-kilometre commitment completed by May 2012.  Some attendees carried signs adorned with the names of people who had died on the highway.

Regular users of the highway have suggested that poor driving is to blame for the majority of collisions, with impatient drivers making poor decisions. Shift work is common in the Fort McMurray and oil sands areas, and residents have suggested that such commuters are more likely to be travelling at unsafe speeds or under the influence of alcohol.  Local MLA Mike Allen stated that he has seen drivers taking unnecessary risks every time he has driven on the highway.  An Alberta Transportation spokeswoman in 2012 said that Highway 63's collision rate is below the provincial average for two-lane highways, though the metric does not account for the percentage of those collisions that are fatal.  Alberta implemented aerial enforcement on multiple highways to catch speeders and reckless drivers in 2012, including Highway 63. The Coalition for a Safer 63 and 881 was created in an attempt to increase awareness and encourage safe driving on the highway and neighbouring Highway 881.  Industry leaders in oil and gas are among the members of the group whose website offers driving tips and features an interactive map of the two highways, describing collisions that have occurred along both routes.

History

Background

Predicated on the rapid development of the Athabasca oil sands in the 1960s, construction of Highway 63 lagged decades behind the other major highways in Alberta that now form core routes of the National Highway System. By the 1930s, roads of varying quality had been constructed along the approximate alignments of present-day Highways 1, 2, 3, 4 and 16, all paralleling existing railways. Highway 63 was developed similarly, with construction of the Alberta and Great Waterways Railway (A&GW) completed by 1920. Prior to the railway, a common route from Edmonton to McMurray was for one to first reach Athabasca by rail, then travel north along the Athabasca and House Rivers before portaging into McMurray.

The completed A&GW Railway made Edmonton trips more feasible, but the population of McMurray remained under 1,000 in the 1930s so a highway to the remote outpost through heavy muskeg and forest had not yet been deemed worthwhile. At this time, the only major road stretching into northern Alberta beyond Lac La Biche was Highway 2, which ran from Edmonton to Athabasca before turning west to Lesser Slave Lake and the Peace Country.  A route splitting from Highway 2 at High Prairie leading to Grande Prairie and the British Columbia border had also been constructed, comprising a portion of present-day Highways 2A, 43, and 49.  Additionally, a short segment of the Mackenzie Highway near Peace River was in place, as were portions of Highways 28, 29 and 36 from Mundare to Cold Lake via Brosseau and St. Paul.

Construction

By 1940, a portion of present-day Highway 63 from Boyle to Atmore had been constructed as an unsigned gravel road that formed part of the route from Athabasca to the western shore of Lac La Biche. By the mid-1950s, this section formed part of Highway 46 which ran from Township Road 590 (then Highway 28) near Radway to the hamlet of Lac La Biche along the present alignment of Highway 63 through Abee, Newbrook and Boyle. Highway 46 had been re-signed as Highways 55 and 63 by the end of the decade.

Until the 1960s, the only access to Fort McMurray was by air, rail, rugged path, or the Athabasca River. In 1957, the first car travelled between Fort McMurray and Edmonton, taking 18 hours to travel  via Wabasca and Slave Lake. Construction of the northern part of Highway 63 beyond Atmore began in 1962 and continued for several years, the first gravel road to connect Fort McMurray to the rest of Alberta's road network. The Grant MacEwan Bridge, a two-lane truss bridge across the Athabasca River, was completed in 1965. It continued into the next decade, with  planned for 1974. In that year, $2.3 million of funding was approved for paving of the highway north of Wandering River, which resulted in an all-weather route from Edmonton to Fort McMurray. Alberta prioritized the project, resulting in delays to work on other projects. Paving work was completed by year's end, but a 1975 budget cut prevented widening of the highway, despite its high number of accidents.

The Ralph Steinhauer Bridge was completed in 1974 alongside the MacEwan, doubling capacity of the highway across the river.  A two-lane bridge over the Hangingstone River in Fort McMurray was completed in 1977. In this year, work also began on a $2.57 million project at the south end of Fort McMurray in the vicinity of Hangingstone; it added a stretch of divided highway, southbound climbing lane, and grade levelling. A second bridge built to carry southbound traffic over the river was completed in 2003.  North of Fort McMurray, the Peter Lougheed Bridge was built across the Athabasca in 1979.  The  structure was initially dubbed the "Bridge to Nowhere" due to the lack of development on the river's east bank near Fort McKay.

After years of both public and political pressure, the provincial government announced in February 2006 that it would begin twinning the entire two-lane portion of the highway from Atmore to the south end of Fort McMurray, the stretch they deemed to be the most dangerous.  Work began in 2006 and was estimated to take at least five years to complete.  The first section was completed in 2008 at a cost of $53 million, stretching south from Airport Road (then Highway 69) to a point south of the Highway 881 intersection.  The Mariana Lakes Country Store near Mariana Lake was closed in September 2008 to make way for the twinning.  It was the only service station between Wandering River and Fort McMurray, but Alberta Transportation had no other options due to the proximity of the lake and utilities.  The store's owner was reluctant to relinquish the property but acknowledged that upgrades to the dangerous highway were more important than the continued operation of the store.  "The twinning of the highway is far more important, and there really is no other way for us to stay here," she stated.  of tree clearing had been completed by February 2010, but further work was delayed until July to protect threatened caribou populations. An additional  of grading near Wandering River was completed by fall 2011.

In October 2012, it was announced that work on the remaining portion of Highway 63 between Grassland and Fort McMurray would be accelerated, and completed by the end of 2016. On April 27, 2012, seven people were killed in a head-on collision south of Fort McMurray. The victims included a Fort McMurray pastor, his pregnant wife and two children. One child was orphaned. The Alberta government was faced with public outrage that the highway had not yet been twinned. At the time of the accident, 46 people had died in accidents on the highway since the 2006 announcement and only 19 kilometres had been twinned.

Premier Alison Redford appointed Fort McMurray-Wood Buffalo MLA Mike Allen as the special advisor to the Minister of Transportation for Highway 63 on May 22, 2012. Allen produced a report with more than 20 suggestions for reducing reckless driving on the highway on July 2, 2012. The report did not offer a precise timeline for converting the highway into a twinned highway, frustrating Mayor Melissa Blake and Shayne Saskiw, the Wildrose MLA for Lac La Biche. Alberta Transportation Minister Ric McIver said twinning the highway at the time would cost $50 million per year and take eight to 11 years if the province adopted a "pay-as-you-go" model.

But the Alberta government was able to shorten this timeline considerably. In October 2012, the Alberta government announced twinning 240 kilometres of Highway 63 would begin immediately and completed by the end of 2016.

On November 5,  of twinned highway opened north of Wandering River and east of McMillan Lake, nine months ahead of schedule.  Approximately half of the section was in Lac La Biche County while the other half was in Athabasca County.  Interchanges in Fort McMurray at Confederation Way and Thickwood Boulveard were completed in late September 2013.

To handle the quickly rising traffic levels in Fort McMurray after 2000, a new three bridge system was devised for the Athabasca River crossing, comprising significant reconstruction of the existing two bridges and a new third bridge.  In 2008, work began on the "Athabasca River Bridge".  The  bridge is seven spans, carrying five westbound lanes over the river on the largest bridge deck in Alberta.  In 2011 the bridge was completed, and that same year modifications to the existing Steinhauer Bridge began.  Built in 1974 to carry westbound traffic, the Steinhauer's two-lane bridge deck was reconstructed and widened to carry three eastbound lanes, with construction completed in 2013.

Extensive reconstruction of the Grant MacEwan Bridge was completed in December 2013, carrying two eastbound lanes over the river.  Prior to this reconfiguration, the MacEwan's two lanes carried all eastbound traffic but upon completion of this project it would serve only as an exit ramp for south/eastbound traffic accessing downtown, while the repurposed Steinhauer Bridge carried the main eastbound through traffic.  The reconstruction consisted of the demolition of the truss superstructure to make way for a modern girder design, while the existing piers were retained.  The piers were slightly shortened with the new bridge deck built on top; the new lanes veer left at the end of the bridge and descend into a short tunnel passing underneath the main eastbound and westbound lanes of Highway 63, connecting to Franklin Avenue downtown.  To access the bridge, southbound traffic exits the highway to the right several hundred meters before the river, immediately after Thickwood Boulevard. The two-lane ramp curves east alongside the main eastbound lanes and forms the two lanes of the MacEwan.

On July 24, 2015, a  section of twinned highway opened, approximately halfway between Mariana Lake and Highway 881. It was followed on August 17 by another  entirely in Athabasca County. On October 15, a  section immediately south of Highway 881 intersection was opened, connecting it to the 16 km north of the intersection that had been completed in 2008. An  section north of Mariana Lake also opened on October 15, and two days later an  stretch at the southern end of the project was finished, beginning at the intersection with Highway 55 near Atmore.

2016 wildfire

In early May 2016, a wildfire encroached on Fort McMurray and surrounding areas, causing a complete evacuation of nearly 90,000 people and over $3 billion in damage.  With twinning of Highway 63 from Fort McMurray to Grassland fully complete by the end of 2015 with the exception of a 3 km section near Wandering River, the upgraded highway was instrumental in the evacuation of Fort McMurray as it is the only route out of the community to the south.  In June, police and firefighters welcomed residents back into Fort McMurray by waving from the King Street overpass as drivers entered the city on Highway 63.  In October 2016, Premier Rachel Notley announced that the bridge would be renamed "Responders Way", and signs were unveiled at a ceremony on March 10, 2017.

Reviews of the evacuation procedures during the fire showed that Highway 63 performed well in the evacuation, but would be best supplemented by another road.  In late October 2016, the Regional Municipality of Wood Buffalo council unanimously voted in support of a second highway that would serve as an alternate evacuation route, tentatively called the East Clearwater Highway.  It would run east of Fort McMurray as an extension of Highway 881 near Anzac, crossing the Clearwater River and connecting to a proposed segment of Highway 686 before continuing north.  The project is estimated to cost $1.5 billion, of which $5 million was committed by council in 2016 for pre-design work.  The road would require provincial funding and the feasibility of its construction was assessed by Notley's government as part of a review of the wildfire evacuation process.

Future

Alberta has long-term plans to twin almost the entire length of Highway 63. A planning study will identify future interchange locations and a twinning plan for the approximately  stretch of the highway between Fort McMurray and the Peter Lougheed Bridge near Fort McKay that remains undivided.  Like the majority of the corridor, this section will ultimately be a six-lane freeway.  As of 2016, all newly twinned sections require second stage paving, and design work is underway.

A study completed in May 2014 assessed the potential alignment and right of way requirements for a twinned Highway 63 from Highway 28 to Ellscott, and a second study assessed the remainder from Ellscott to Highway 55.  There are also plans to upgrade the southern portion of Highway 28 from near Gibbons to the Highway 63 split, and the entire length of Highway 28A, creating a fully divided highway from Edmonton to Fort McMurray.  In Fort McMurray, a 2006 study recommended the construction of an interchange at Main Street as an expansion of the collector-distributor system.

Major intersections

Notes

References

External links

Northeast Provincial Highway Projects by Alberta Transportation
Coalition for a Safer 63 and 881
Twin Highway 63 Now
Highway 63 timelapse in Fort McMurray
Aerial video of traffic jam during 2016 wildfire evacuation

063
063
Transport in Fort McMurray